Paripocregyes terminaliae is a species of beetle in the family Cerambycidae. It was described by Fisher in 1933, originally under the genus Ipocregyes.

References

Mesosini
Beetles described in 1933